

S

References